Jao por (Thai: เจ้าพ่อ, “godfather”) is a term used in Thailand to describe Thai organized crime groups.

Meaning of the term
Chao pho or jao poh literally means “godfather.” Chao pho, mostly based in the provinces, have business interests in both legitimate and criminal activities. Moreover, they have groups of associates and followers, move closely with powerful bureaucrats, policemen and military figures, sit in positions in local administration, and play a key role in parliamentary elections.

Activities
According to Thai authorities, there are chao pho groups in 39 of Thailand's 77 provinces. From these provinces they work like a local mafia as they are active in both illegal as well as some legitimate businesses. They are involved in a wide range of criminal activities such as prostitution, drug trafficking, illegal gambling and others. They are known for cooperating with the Red Wa (who are associated with the United Wa State Army) for the trafficking and sale of narcotics.

References

Organised crime groups in Thailand
Thai words and phrases
Chinese secret societies
Triad (organized crime)